Al-Qadsiah Football Club is a Saudi Arabian professional football club that competes in the Saudi First Division League. They are based in Khobar and their home ground is the Prince Saud bin Jalawi Stadium.

History 
Al-Qadsiah have been a regular and uninterrupted participant in the Saudi Premier League since its inception in the inaugural 1976-77 season, their best ever top-flight season came in the 1980–81 season when they finished in 3rd place. Al-Qadsiah's most successful period in their history came in the early 90's when they won the 1991-92 Crown Prince Cup against Al-Shabab (4–2) on penalties to claim their first ever top flight title. The club's cup win qualified them to the Asian Cup Winners' Cup, they reached the final to face South China AA who they beat 6-2 on aggregate to clinch the 1993–94 title. In the same season they also picked up the 1993–94 Saudi Federation Cup by beating Al-Nasser 2-0 in the final. After 21 consecutive seasons in the top flight, as well as achieving two domestic titles and one continental title the club was relegated for the first time in their history in the 1996–97 season.

Following the club's first relegation, Al-Qadsiah have become inconsistent in their performances, yo-yoing between divisions with five promotions and relegations since the 1999-00 season.

Administration
The current administration that runs the club is the club-president Madi Al-Hajri and vice-president Abdullah Badgaish.

Honours

Domestic
Crown Prince Cup:
 Winners (1): 1991–92
 Runners-up (1): 2004–05

Saudi Federation Cup:
 Winners (1): 1993–94
 Runners-up (2): 1989–90, 1992–93

First Division League:
 Winners (3): 2001–02, 2008–09, 2014–15
 Runners-up (1): 1999–00, 2019-20

Saudi Futsal League:
 Winners (1): 2020

Asian
Asian Cup Winners' Cup:
 Winners (1): 1993–94

International Competitions

Overview

Record By Country

Matches

Key: 1R/2R – First/Second round; R16 – Round of 16; QF – Quarter-final; SF – Semi-final;

Notes

Current squad

Other players under contract

Out on loan

Managerial history

 Ali Sayed Ahmed Sheikh (1969–71)
 Khalil Ibrahim Al-Zayani (1992–93)
 Ján Pivarník (1993–94)
 Hans-Dieter Schmidt (1995–96)
 Noureddine Saâdi (1997–98)
 Cabralzinho (1999–01)
 Ahmad Al-Ajlani (2001–03)
 Youssef Zouaoui (2003)
 Ján Pivarník (2003–04)
 Ahmad Al-Ajlani (2004–05)
 Abderrazek Chebbi (October 1, 2008 – May 12, 2009)
 Daniel Lanata (June 26, 2009 – August 29, 2009)
 Ammar Souayah (August 29, 2009 – November 27, 2009)
 Anas Al-Zerqati (caretaker) (November 27, 2009 – December 9, 2009)
 Dimitar Dimitrov (December 9, 2009 – June 1, 2011)
 Mariano Barreto (June 6, 2011 – February 11, 2013)
 Mladen Frančić (February 11, 2013 – May 4, 2013)
 Abderrazek Chebbi (August 7, 2013 – February 10, 2014)
 Omar Bakhashwain (February 13, 2014 – March 2, 2014)
 Ayman Lajdidi (March 2, 2014 – April 5, 2014)
 Gjoko Hadžievski (May 27, 2014 – October 12, 2014)
 Jameel Qassem (October 20, 2014 – October 30, 2015)
 Alexandre Gallo (October 30, 2015 – January 29, 2016)
 Hamad Al-Dossari (January 29, 2016 – October 29, 2016)
 Riadh Belkhir (October 29, 2016 – November 9, 2016)
 Hélio dos Anjos (November 9, 2016 – April 22, 2017)
 Bandar Basraih (April 22, 2017 – May 5, 2017)
 Nacif Beyaoui (June 16, 2017 – November 2, 2017)
 Paulo Bonamigo (November 2, 2017 – February 5, 2018)
 Bandar Basraih (February 5, 2018 – April 13, 2018)
 Aleksandar Stanojević (May 23, 2018 – November 4, 2018)
 Ivaylo Petev (November 5, 2018 – March 10, 2019)
 Bandar Basraih (March 10, 2019 – April 22, 2019)
 Nacif Beyaoui (April 22, 2019 – May 16, 2019)
 Yousef Al Mannai (June 30, 2019 – June 7, 2021)
 Mohammed Dahmane (July 2, 2021 – December 23, 2021)
 Aleksandar Ilić (January 8, 2022 – May 31, 2022)
 Khaled Al-Atwi (June 18, 2022 – September 22, 2022)
 Habib Ben Romdhane (September 22, 2022 – )

References

Qadsiah
Qadsiah
Qadsiah
Football clubs in Eastern Province, Saudi Arabia
Khobar
Asian Cup Winners Cup winning clubs